Jonas is a common male name in many Western world countries. It is primarily used as a first name, but also occurs as a surname. It is particularly frequent in Germany, Israel, the Netherlands, Flanders and Scandinavia. It is also the most common name in Lithuania, however, in Lithuania, the name Jonas is derived from the Hebrew Yohanan as opposed to Jonah. Its widespread use and popularity has roots in its Jewish and Christian origins. As a surname, it is often Jewish, whilst as a first name it is mostly used in countries where Christianity is the main religion, especially in Scandinavian countries and Germany. In Turkish, Arabic, Persian and the Muslim world the equivalent name is Yunus (یونس) or Yunas or Younes/Younis. In North America the name found popularity among Métis and Aboriginals in the Northwest.

Etymology 
Jonas most often represents Hebrew Yōnā meaning 'dove', the name of multiple Biblical figures.  The form Jonah is taken directly from Hebrew, while the form with s is adapted through Greek.

Greek Ίωνας (Ionas) may also mean "Ionian", a member of the Greek tribe Ιωνες Iones who colonized western Asia.

Notable people with the given name Jonas 
 Jonas, father of Simon Peter; written as "John" or "Jonah" in some translations of the Bible.
Jonas Åkerlund, Swedish movie and music video director
 Jonas Erik Altberg aka Basshunter (born 1984), Swedish producer and DJ
Jonas Armstrong, British/Irish actor
Jonas Arnell-Szurkos, Research Officer, Expert on Orders
Jonas Basanavičius, an activist and a signatory of the Act of Independence of Lithuania
Jonas Biliūnas, Lithuanian short story writer
Jonas Bjerre, lead singer and guitarist of Danish band Mew
Jonas Björkman, Swedish tennis player
Jonas Bronck, American colonist after whom the Bronx River, and by extension, the county and New York City borough of The Bronx are named
Jonas Eriksson, several people
Jonas Folger, German motorbike racer 
Jonas Galusha, American politician and 5th governor of Vermont
Jonas Gardell, Swedish writer and comedian
Jonas Green, Colonial American newspaper publisher
Jonas Griffith (born 1997), American football player
Jonas Grof, German basketball player
Jonas Gunnarsson, several people
Jonas Gustavsson, NHL goaltender
Jonás Gutiérrez, Argentine footballer
Jonas Haggren, Swedish Navy rear admiral
Jónas Hallgrímsson, Icelandic poet, author and naturalist
Jonas Hector, German footballer 
Jonas Hellborg, Swedish bass player
Jonas Hiller, Swiss NHL goaltender
Jonas Höglund, NHL hockey player
Jonas Jablonskis, Lithuanian language linguist and modifier of the standard Lithuanian language
 Jonas Jarlsby, Guitarist of the Swedish metal band "Avatar"
Jonas Jennings, American professional football player
Jonas Jerebko, Swedish NBA basketball player
Jonas Kaufmann, German opera singer
Jonas Kyratzes, writer and game designer
 Jonas Mačiulis aka Maironis, Lithuanian writer and poet
Jonas Mačiulis, a Lithuanian basketball player
Jonas Mekas, Lithuanian film maker
Jonas of Orléans (760–841), Bishop of Orléans
Jonas Gonçalves Oliveira, Brazilian international footballer
Jonas Phillips, Jewish-American merchant and former owner of Monticello, historic home of Thomas Jefferson
Jonas Portin, Finnish footballer
Jonás Ramalho, Spanish-Angolan footballer
Jonas Reckermann, German beach volleyball player
Jonas Renkse, Singer of Swedish band Katatonia
Jonas Sakuwaha, Zambian footballer
Jonas Salk, American physician and researcher, best known for the development of the first polio vaccine
Jonas Savimbi, Angolan revolutionary
Jonas Sparring, Swedish professional ice hockey goaltender
Jonas Gahr Støre, Norwegian politician
Jonas Erikson Sundahl (1678–1762), Swedish-born architect who spent most of his working life in Germany
Jonas Švedas, Lithuanian composer
Jonas March Tebbetts (1820–1913), American politician
Jonas Tomalty, Canadian rock musician from Montréal
Jonas Vaitkus, lecturer and film director in Lithuania
Jonas Valančiūnas (born 1992), Lithuanian basketball player
Jonas Vileišis, Lithuanian lawyer, politician, and diplomat
Jonas Vingegaard, Danish cyclist
Jonas Wikman, Swedish officer
Jonas Wohlfarth-Bottermann (born 1990), German basketball player
Jhonas Enroth, Swedish ice hockey player
Yunus Nadi Abalıoğlu, Turkish journalist
Yunus Altun, Turkish footballer
Yunus Emre, Turkish poet and mystic

Notable people with the surname Jonas
 Abraham Jonas (politician), politician
 Abraham Jonas (rugby league), rugby league player
 Alberto Jonás, pianist
 Ann Jonas, writer
 Benjamin F. Jonas, politician
 Billy Jonas, folk musician
 Bruno Jonas, political cabaret artist, Germany
 Charles Jonas (disambiguation), a number of American politicians
 Clemens Jonas, figure skater
 Danielle Jonas, wife of Kevin Jonas of the Jonas Brothers
 Don Jonas, American footballer
 Dusty Jonas, high jumper
 Edgar A. Jonas, politician
 Émile Jonas (1827–1905), French composer
 Fran Jonas (born 2004), New Zealand cricketer
 Frankie Jonas, younger brother to Nick Jonas, Kevin Jonas, and Joe Jonas of the Jonas Brothers
 Franz Jonas, politician, President of Austria
 George Jonas, author
 George "Freddie" Jonas, businessman and philanthropist who founded Camp Rising Sun
 Gilbert Jonas, businessman
 Glenn Jonas, cricketer
 Hans Jonas, philosopher
 Howard Jonas, businessman
 Israel Heymann Jonas (17951851), German malacologist
 Joan Jonas, artist
 John Jonas, metallurgist
 Joseph Jonas (disambiguation), a number of people including
 Joseph Jonas, politician
 Joe Jonas, musician, member of Jonas Brothers
 Justus Jonas, Protestant reformer
 Kevin Jonas, musician, oldest member of Jonas Brothers
 Louis Paul Jonas, master sculptor, museum exhibit designer, taxidermist
 Margarete Jonas, wife of the former federal president of Austria
 Marie Jonas, physician
 Mark Jonas, football (soccer) player
 Maryla Jonas, pianist
 Michal Jonáš, footballer
 Nathan S. Jonas (1868—1943), American banker and philanthropist
 Nick Jonas, musician, youngest member of Jonas Brothers
 Peter Jonas (disambiguation), a number of people including
 Peter Jonas (footballer), an Australian rules footballer
 Peter Jonas (figure skater)
 Priyanka Jonas, Indian actress, model and film producer
 Regina Jonas, rabbi
 Sophie Jonas, English actress
 Tom Jonas, Australian Rules Football player
 William Jonas, footballer

Fictional characters
 Eldred Jonas, character from the novel Wizard and Glass by Stephen King
 Jonas, the main character in the Giver trilogy by Lois Lowry
 Jonas, a character in the online serial lonelygirl15, portrayed by Jackson Davis
 Jonas Blane, one of the lead characters in the American television show The Unit
 Jonas Grumby, the Skipper from the television sitcom Gilligan's Island
 Jonas Hodges, a villain in Season 7 of 24 played by Jon Voight
 Jonas Morecock, a homosexual animated character
 Jonas Quinn, character in the sci-fi series Stargate SG-1
 Jonas Wilkerson, character from Gone With the Wind.
 Michael Jonas, character in the sci-fi series Star Trek: Voyager
 Jonas Taylor, character in an action horror movie The Meg
 Jonas Kahnwald, character in the German sci-fi series Dark
 Jonas Miller, character in the movie Twister.
 Jonas Hunter, the late son of Rip Hunter  in Legends of Tomorrow.
 Jonas, character from the French movie I am Jonas
 Jonas, character from the Brazilian movie Jonas

Male variants 
 Giona (Italian)
 Jonàs (Catalan)
 Jona (Croatian)
 Jonáš (Czech)
 Jonah (English)
 Jonas (German, Swedish, Dutch, Lithuanian and Portuguese)
 Jónás (Hungarian)
 Jónas (Icelandic)
 Junis (Kazakh)
 Junus (Kyrgyz)
 Jonasz (Polish)
 Jonaš (Prekmurje dialect of Slovene)
 Jonáš (Slovak)
 Jona (Slovene)
 Jonás (Spanish)
 Yona (Hebrew)
Yonas (ዮናስ) (Tigrigna) (Eritrean)
 Yunus (Turkish)
Yunes (یونس) (Persian)
 Younes (يونس) (Arabic)
 Joonas (Estonian and Finnish)
 Yunsi (Berber)
 Ionas (Ίωνας) (Greek)

Contemporary use of the name Jonas 
 "My Name Is Jonas", a song from the alternative rock band Weezer's Blue Album.
 "Jonas, or the Artist at Work", a short story from the collection Exile and the Kingdom by French author Albert Camus
 Protagonist of Lois Lowry's novel The Giver.

Danish masculine given names
Dutch masculine given names
English masculine given names
English-language surnames
German masculine given names
German-language surnames
Hebrew-language names
Icelandic masculine given names
Jewish masculine given names
Jewish surnames
Lithuanian masculine given names
Norwegian masculine given names
Swedish masculine given names
Swiss masculine given names